Rama II may refer to

Rama II (1767-1824), a monarch of Siam (Thailand)
Rama II (novel) by Arthur C. Clarke and Gentry Lee